Communities First Football Club are a football club based in Cefn Mawr, Wrexham County Borough. They competed in the Welsh National League (Wrexham Area) Division One in the 2009–10 season, finishing in third place.

References 

Football clubs in Wales
Sport in Wrexham County Borough
2007 establishments in Wales